Paul Barden (born 1 July 1980) is a former Gaelic footballer who played at senior level for the Longford county team from October 1998 until February 2015 when he announced his retirement. He was the longest serving inter-county player in the country until his retirement. He won an O'Byrne Cup medal with them in 2000, he also won 2 O'Byrne Shield medals in 2006 and 2007. He was also a member of the Ireland international rules football team in 2002 and 2006. He also won a Railway Cup with Leinster in 2001 and 2002. In 2011, he captained Longford to victory over Roscommon in the National Football League Div 4 final at Croke Park and in 2012, Longford were back at Croke Park, this time for the Division 3 final and again won beating Wexford with Barden once again captain.

He plays his club football with Clonguish with whom he won 3 Longford Senior Football Championships in 2003, 2004 and 2009. He also plays hurling with the club and won Longford Senior Hurling Championships in 2003, 2005 and 2006.

In 2020 he was voted the best Longford Footballer of the past 50 years (1970-2020) in an Irish Independent poll of top 20 Longford footballers.

He is the nephew of 1960s Longford footballer Brendan Barden.

Honours
 3 Longford Senior Football Championships (2003, 2004, 2009)
 5 Longford Senior Hurling Championships (2003, 2005, 2006, 2012, 2019)
 2 Railway Cups (2001, 2002)
 2 O'Bryne Cup Shields (2006, 2007)
 1 O'Byrne Cup (1999)
 1 National Football League Division 4 (2011) [c]
 1 National Football League Division 3 (2012) [c]
 1 May Player of the Month (2012)

References

1980 births
Living people
Clonguish Gaelic footballers
Clonguish hurlers
Dual players
Gaelic football forwards
Irish international rules football players
Longford inter-county Gaelic footballers
Longford inter-county hurlers